Chornomornaftogaz (also: Chernomorneftegaz, lit. "Black Sea oil and gas") is an oil and gas company located along Krymgazseti in Simferopol, Crimea. The company was established with the order of the Ministry of Gas Industry of the USSR on 20 October 1978 №209-org to develop oil and gas resources in the Black Sea and the Sea of Azov.

It is legally a subsidiary of Ukraine's state-owned oil and gas company Naftogaz. However, after the 2014 Crimean crisis it was seized by the region's parliament in the run-up to its annexation by Russia.  There was also a privately owned oil company Chernomorneftegaz, registered in Moscow in 1998 and purchased by Rosneft in 2011, which is not linked to Chornomornaftogaz.

History
The company was established with the order of the Ministry of Gas Industry of the USSR on October 20, 1978 №209-org to develop oil and gas resources in the Black Sea and the Sea of Azov.

The May 2012 purchase of Petro Hodovanets (ex-West Juno) and Nezalezhnist was criticized due to corruption and money laundering allegations and higher purchase price that the market price. These rigs were nicknamed the "Boyko towers" after the former energy minister Yuriy Boyko.

In 2013, Chornomornaftogaz produced  of natural gas.  In 2012, it produced  of natural gas, 62,800 tonnes of natural-gas condensate, and 8,900 tonnes of crude oil. The research group IHS reported that in 2013 Chornomorneftegaz accounted for 7.9% of Ukraine's gas production and 2.4% of its oil production.

During annexation of Crimea by the Russian Federation in 2014 the company was seized by the region's parliament in the run-up to its annexation by Russia.

In February 2014, Ukraine's state-owned oil and gas company Naftogaz sued Chornomornaftogaz for delayed debt payments of 11.614 billion UAH (almost €1 billion) in the Economic Court of the Crimean Autonomous Republic.

In March 2014, Crimean authorities announced that they would nationalize the company.  Crimean deputy prime minister Rustam Temirgaliev said that Russia's Gazprom would be the new owner.  A group of Gazprom representatives, including its head of business development, has been working at the Chornomornaftogaz head office since mid-March 2014.  Formally, nationalized assets were transferred to the newly established company Crimean  Republican  Enterprise  Chernomorneftegaz, which was later reorganized into state unitary enterprise Chernomorneftegaz.  On 11 April 2014, the U.S. Treasury's Office of Foreign Assets Control announced that it had added Chornomornaftagaz to the Specially Designated Nationals and Blocked Persons List as part of the U.S. sanctions against Russia.  Reuters quoted an anonymous U.S. official who explained that the United States wanted to make it impossible for Gazprom to "have dealings with Chornomornaftogaz", and if that were to happen, Gazprom itself could face sanctions.  The European Union followed suit on 13 May 2014, the first time its sanctions list has included a company.   Naftogaz has considered to file a suit against Russia in international arbitration for a compensation for the seized company.

In December 2015, Chornomornaftogaz moved two jack-up rigs—Tavrida and Petro Hodovanets—from Odeske gas field to Russian territorial waters due to disputed status of the field and a risk that rigs will be arrested by the Ukrainian authorities.

On 20 June 2022, when the 2022 Russian invasion of Ukraine was in full swing, Sergey Aksyonov announced that "the enemy" had struck an undisclosed Chornomornaftogaz production facility somewhere in the Black Sea near Tarkhankut, the southwestern cape of the peninsula. Aksyonov reported that there had been three strikes at three natural gas rigs.

Operations
Chornomornaftogaz is an integrated oil and gas company engaged in natural gas explorations and production, transport, storage, and distribution. It operates the Hlibovske underground gas storage. Its offshore operations are concentrated primarily in the northwestern part of the Black Sea shelf.

The company has licenses for 17 fields, including 11 gas fields, four oil fields and two gas condensate fields.  Its licenses for offshore fields include:
 Odeske,
 Shtormove,
 Prykerchenske,
 Holitsynske,
 Arkhangelske,
 Bezimenne,
 Subbotinske, and
 Strilkove

In addition it owns licenses for Jankoy and Semenwckoye onshore fields. 

The company owns four jack-up rigs (Syvash, Tavrida, Petro Hodovanets, and Nezalezhnist) and eight fixed drilling platforms.

References

External links
 

 
Companies based in Crimea
Natural gas pipeline companies
Natural gas companies of Ukraine
Natural gas companies of Russia
Oil companies of Ukraine
Oil companies of Russia
Crimea
Natural gas companies of the Soviet Union